is a former Japanese cyclist. He competed at the 1956 Summer Olympics and the 1960 Summer Olympics.

References

External links
 

1936 births
Living people
Japanese male cyclists
Olympic cyclists of Japan
Cyclists at the 1956 Summer Olympics
Cyclists at the 1960 Summer Olympics
People from Hokkaido
Asian Games medalists in cycling
Cyclists at the 1958 Asian Games
Asian Games gold medalists for Japan
Medalists at the 1958 Asian Games